The Bangladesh Journalists Welfare Trust is a Bangladesh government owned trust that is responsible for the welfare of journalists in Bangladesh. The trustee board of the trust is chaired by the Minister of Information.

History
The bill to form the trust was approved by the Cabinet of Bangladesh on 4 November 2013. The Parliament of Bangladesh passed on 1 July 2014. The Bangladesh Journalists Welfare Trust was established in 2014 with an initial fund of 50 million taka from Prime Minister Sheikh Hasina. Private media houses donated further funds.

On 4 September 2016, Iqbal Sobhan Chowdhury, Media Affairs Adviser to the Prime Minister of Bangladesh, handed over checks to 27 journalists from the trust at Chittagong Press Club.

On 12 October 2018, Prime Minister Sheikh Hasina allocated 200 million taka for the fund.

Prime Minister Sheikh Hasina distributed to sick journalists and families of deceased journalists in a ceremony on 7 November 2019.

On 27 April 2021, Prime Minister of Bangladesh, Sheikh Hasina allocated 100 million taka to the trust to provide support to journalists during the COVID-19 pandemic in Bangladesh.

References

2014 establishments in Bangladesh
Organisations based in Dhaka
Government departments of Bangladesh
Government-owned companies of Bangladesh
Mass media in Bangladesh